A restriction enzyme or restriction endonuclease is a special type of biological macromolecule that functions as part of the "immune system" in bacteria. One special kind of restriction enzymes is the class of "homing endonucleases", these being present in all three domains of life, although their function seems to be very different from one domain to another.

The classical restriction enzymes cut up, and hence render harmless, any unknown (non-cellular) DNA that enters a bacterial cell as a result of a viral infection. They recognize a specific DNA sequence, usually short (3 to 8 bp), and cut it, producing either blunt or overhung ends, either at or nearby the recognition site.

Restriction enzymes are quite variable in the short DNA sequences they recognize. An organism often has several different enzymes, each specific to a distinct short DNA sequence.

See the main article on restriction enzyme.
Further reading: Homing endonuclease.



Restriction enzymes catalog
The list includes some of the most studied examples of restriction endoncleases. The following information is given:

The whole list contains more than 1,200 enzymes, but databases register about 4,000.

To make a list that is accessible to navigation, this list has been divided into different pages. Each page contains somewhere between 120-150 entries. Choose a letter to go to a specific part of the list:

Notes and references

See also

 List of homing endonuclease cutting sites
 Restriction enzyme.
 Isoschizomer.
 Detailed articles about certain restriction enzymes: EcoRI, HindIII, BglII.
 Homing endonuclease.
 Introns and inteins.
 Intragenomic conflict: Homing endonuclease genes.
  I-CreI homing endonuclease.

External links
Databases and lists of restriction enzymes:
 Very comprehensive database of restriction enzymes supported by New England Biolabs. It includes all kind of biological, structural, kinetical and commercial information about thousands of enzymes. Also includes related literature for every molecule: 
 Detailed information for biochemical experiments: 
 Alphabetical list of enzymes and their restriction sites: 
 General information about restriction sites and biochemical conditions for restriction reactions: 
Databases of proteins:
 Database of structures of proteins, solved at atomic resolution: 
 Databases of proteins: 

Biotechnology
Restriction enzyme cutting sites
Restriction enzymes
Enzymes
Proteins